Sprimont is a municipality of Wallonia located in the province of Liège, Belgium.

The municipality consists of the following districts: Dolembreux, Gomzé-Andoumont, Louveigné, Rouvreux, and Sprimont. 

Other villages: Banneux, Damré, Florzé, Lincé, Ogné, Presseux, and Rivage.

On January 1, 2006, Sprimont had a total population of 12,782.

Etymology

Sprimont is an ancient name, the earliest written records of which date from 855 and 856 AD. These are located in the Abbey of Stavelot.

The etymology of Sprimont is uncertain. A priori, it seems to be the name of a place; however some historians propose that it may derive from a person's name.<ref>Bulletin et annales de l’Academie d’Archeologie de Belgique, vol. XXXVIII, Bulletin de l'Institute Archeologique Liégeoise, vol. VII</ref>

Spellings of Sprimont may be different, depending on (1) the written language, and (2) the time period. Since Sprimont is more than 1,100 years old, a variety of different spellings are to be expected. For example, Ernst cites "Sprismonte" in 888 AD, and Martine & Duraud cite "Sprismont" in 1049. However, since about 1000 AD "Sprimont" seems to be exclusively used. In  (vol. VII), there are further references to the Teutonic  and the Frisian , as well as the Latin . These translate as 'speer', 'hasta,' and 'lance.'

There is a consensus that the root is of a Latin origin. However, some historians point out that many geographical names with this suffix belong to places not on a hill, some of which are even in valleys. This may cast doubt on the true meaning being "hill", but another source indicates that  was used in Roman times to indicate a way-station for travellers.

As for the prefix of spri-'', more debate is required, as its origin seems to be lost to antiquity. Ancient written documents indicate several possible Latin origins: . Regardless of the meaning of the root word, one must also consider the usage in the context of the name itself. For example, if it does indeed refer to a species of tree or wood, in those ancient times, what was the connotation? It has been argued persuasively that 'spri' means 'lance'.

Concluding the etymology of Sprimont, the active might mean 'Mounted Warrior', whereas the passive might mean 'Lance of Defence'.

Gallery

See also
 List of protected heritage sites in Sprimont

References

External links
 
http://www.sprimont.be
http://www.sprimont.net

 
Municipalities of Liège Province